Once Upon a Time is a 2017 Russian comedy-drama film directed by Eduard Parri.

Plot 
The film takes place in a village where two adult men live, between which the war for a widowed woman begins.

Cast 
 Fyodor Dobronravov as Grishka
 Roman Madyanov as Lyokha
 Irina Rozanova as Tatiana

References

External links 
 

2017 films
2017 comedy-drama films
2010s Russian-language films
Russian comedy-drama films